Otopleura glans, common name the acorn pyram,  is a species of sea snail, a marine gastropod mollusk in the family Pyramidellidae, the pyrams and their allies.

Description
The white shell has a narrow chocolate band above and below the suture. The lower half of the body whorl is chocolate colored. The shell is longitudinally closely ribbed. The interstices are spirally striated. The length of shell varies between 8 mm and 15 mm.

Distribution
This marine species occurs off Vietnam and the Philippines.

References

 Springsteen, F.J. & Leobrera, F.M. (1986). Shells of the Philippines . Manila : Carfel Seashell Museum. pp. 1–377, 100 pls.

External links
 To World Register of Marine Species
 

Pyramidellidae
Gastropods described in 1843